The Government of Wales Act 2006 (c 32) is an Act of the Parliament of the United Kingdom that reformed the then-National Assembly for Wales (now the Senedd) and allows further powers to be granted to it more easily. The Act creates a system of government with a separate executive drawn from and accountable to the legislature. It is part of a series of laws legislating Welsh devolution.

Provisions
The Act has the following provisions:

creates an executive body—the Welsh Assembly Government (known since May 2011 as the Welsh Government)—that is separate from the legislative body, that is, the National Assembly for Wales. The Welsh Government is therefore altered from being a committee of the National Assembly to being a distinct body
forbids candidates both contesting constituencies and being on a regional list
provides a mechanism for Orders in Council to delegate power from Parliament to the Assembly, which will give the Assembly powers to make "Measures" (Welsh Laws). Schedule 5 of the Act describes the fields in which the assembly has Measure making powers.
provides for a referendum for further legislature competencies, to be known as "Acts of the Assembly", expanding the Assembly's legislative competence
creates a Welsh Seal and a Keeper of the Welsh Seal (the First Minister)
creates a Welsh Consolidated Fund
creates the post of Counsel General as a member of the Welsh Government and its chief legal adviser.
assigns to the Queen new functions of formally appointing Welsh ministers and granting royal assent to Acts of the Assembly.

The bill received Royal assent on 25 July 2006.

The part that provides for Acts was brought into force, and the relating to Measures and related Orders in Council ceased to have effect, on 5 May 2011 following the 2011 Welsh devolution referendum. The Act was further amended to rename the Assembly to Senedd Cymru, and further extend its legislative competence to the reserved matters model, by the Wales Act 2014.

Schedule 5 of the Act

Schedule 5 of the Act describes the 20 "Fields" and "Matters" in which the National Assembly for Wales had legislative competence, i.e. the ability to pass Assembly Measures. A Field is a broad subject area, such as education and training, the environment, health and health services, highways and transport, or housing. A Matter is a specific defined policy area within a Field.

The Assembly could gain further legislative competence by the amendment of Schedule 5. There were two ways in which this can happen: either as a result of clauses included in legislation passed by an Act of Parliament at Westminster, or by Legislative Competence Orders (LCOs) granted by Parliament in response to a request from the National Assembly itself (LCOs could be proposed by the Welsh Government, or by individual members, or by Assembly Committees, but had to be approved by the National Assembly before they could go forward). The result of either method was to amend any of the 20 Fields by inserting specific Matters. The Assembly then had competence to pass legislation on those Matters.

Schedule 5 was regularly updated as result of these two processes.

Schedule 5 became moot when the Assembly gained the competence to pass Acts, which were restricted to Matters listed in Schedule 7 rather than Schedule 5, and lost the competence to pass Measures.

Fields of Schedule 5

Field 1: agriculture, fisheries, forestry and rural development
Field 2: ancient monuments and historic buildings
Field 3: culture
Field 4: economic development
Field 5: education and training
Field 6: environment
Field 7: fire and rescue services and promotion of fire safety
Field 8: food
Field 9: health and health services
Field 10: highways and transport
Field 11: housing
Field 12: local government
Field 13: National Assembly for Wales
Field 14: public administration
Field 15: social welfare
Field 16: sport and recreation
Field 17: tourism
Field 18: town and country planning
Field 19: water and flood defence
Field 20: Welsh language

Criticism
The Government of Wales Act 2006 was criticised by Plaid Cymru for not delivering a fully-fledged parliament.

See also
Welsh devolution
Government of Wales Act 1998
Wales Act 2014
Wales Act 2017
Contemporary Welsh Law

References

External links
Government of Wales Act 2006 website
Assembly Powers Tracking Notes
 WAGs tracking notes

UK Legislation 

Explanatory notes to the Government of Wales Act 2006.

Government of Wales
Senedd
United Kingdom Acts of Parliament 2006
Constitutional laws of Wales
Acts of the Parliament of the United Kingdom concerning Wales
2006 in Wales
Welsh devolution
July 2006 events in the United Kingdom